Rosa stellata is a species of rose known by the common names desert rose, gooseberry rose, and star rose. It occurs in the mountain canyons of Arizona and New Mexico. It also grows in dry, rocky places. It has trifoliate leaves, deep rose purple blossoms and yellowish white prickles on the petioles and stems. It is a perennial shrub with velvety, deciduous leaves. Some horticulturists consider it to be a browse plant.

Rosa stellata can be used as a groundcover or small shrub and grows best when partially exposed to sunlight. The purple flowers bloom in the summer and it typically grows to be between 16 and 24 inches tall. It attracts native bees and bumble bees. Native bees also use the plant for nesting materials.

References

External links
Rosa stellata Woot
Photo gallery USDA Plants

stellata
Flora of Arizona
Flora of New Mexico
Flora of Texas
Flora of North America